The Trans-Tocantins languages are a proposed subgroup of the Northern Jê languages, which comprises four languages spoken to the west of the Tocantins River: Apinajé, Mẽbêngôkre, Kĩsêdjê, and Tapayúna. It is subdivided in a binary manner into Apinajé, spoken to the east of the Araguaia River, and the Trans-Araguaia subbranch, which includes the remaining three languages. Together with the Timbira dialect continuum, the Trans-Tocantins languages make up the Northern branch of the Jê family.

The defining innovations of the Trans-Tocantins languages include the replacement of Proto-Goyaz Jê and Proto-Northern Jê *a-mbə ‘eat (intransitive)’ (as preserved in Canela/Krahô/Parkatêjê apà, Pykobjê aapỳ, Panará -ânpâ) with Proto-Trans-Tocantins *ap-ku (> Apinajé apku, Mẽbêngôkre aku, Kĩsêdjê/Tapayúna akhu). as well as the fortition of Proto-Northern Jê *j to *ĵ in unstressed syllables (except if preceded by the low vowel *a), as shown below.

References

Jê languages
Languages of Brazil